Jean-Claude Hiquet (4 November 1939 – September 2022) was a French rugby union player who played as a . He played one match for the French national team on 22 February 1964 against England.

Awards
Winner of the French Division 1 (1962, 1965)
Winner of the Challenge Yves du Manoir

References

1939 births
2022 deaths
French rugby union players
Rugby union fly-halves
France international rugby union players
SU Agen Lot-et-Garonne players
Sportspeople from Landes (department)